Diadegma amphipoeae is a wasp first described by Kusigemati in 1993. No subspecies are listed.

References

amphipoeae
Insects described in 1993